Cedar Creek, also called Brush Creek, is a stream in Chase County, Kansas. It is a tributary to the Cottonwood River.

The  Cedar Creek's headwaters include three streams, the Cedar Creek, Bill's Creek, and Middle Creek. Cedar Creek and the south fork of the Cottonwood River flow into the Cottonwood River, which is a tributary of the Neosho River. Minnows, crayfish, and spotted bass reside in the stream.

See also
List of rivers of Kansas

References

Geography of Chase County, Kansas
Rivers of Kansas